This is a list of artificial islands.

Table

Australia
Runway of Sydney Airport
Areas around the Gold Coast region
Port of Sydney
Port of Melbourne

Bahrain
New Bahrain International Airport

Bolivia 
 See #Peru/Bolivia

Brazil
Cidade Universitária (Rio de Janeiro)
Jangadeiros Island

Bulgaria

In Varna, a portion of the southern industrial and port zone on a 2-km wide isthmus between the Black Sea and Lake Varna became an artificial island in 1976 when it became separated from the shore by two navigable canals.

China
Dongjiang, an island at Bohai Bay, near Beijing, 33.5 km², for cargo transfer and wetlands reconstruction.
Runways of Shanghai Pudong Airport
Port and Urban Areas around Xiamen, Shantou & Ningbo-Zhoushan
Amusement Park at Liuye Lake Changde
Zhanghe Airport, Jingmen
Zhuhai General Aviation Airport
Several Islands off the coast of Fengchengzhen, Shandong 
Coastal Extensions around Bindao Island, Weihai
Rizhao Port
Xinjiancun Coast Islands
Qingdao Linghai Hot Spring Golf Club
Qingdao Port
Maojia Port, Qidong City
Rudong Coast Extensions
Extensions on coasts around Yangjia Bay
Islands off the coast of Lingezhuang
Dongzhuang Coast Extensions
Longkou Harbor Port and Islands
Banweiba Ditch Port & Coastal extensions
Land bordering Bailang Estuary
Jiangdao Coast Extensions
Lianyungang Port
Ganyu Coast
Rudong Yangkou Harbour
Shenzhen Bao'an International Airport Runway
Ports of Pingtan Island
Ports of Jiangyin Island, Fuqing, Fuzhou
Lands surrounding Luoyuan Bay, Luoyuan, Fuzhou
Ports in Xinghua Bay

Egypt
 Coasts of Hurghada
 Coasts of Alexandria
 Ain Sokhna

Germany
 Dithmarschen
 Bremerhaven

Hong Kong
Hong Kong Convention and Exhibition Centre - new wing on a man-made island off the coast of the old wing at Wan Chai. 
An artificial island in the artificial Inspiration Lake in the former Penny's Bay
Macau Ferry Terminal - an artificial island connected by a skyway to another artificial island, and further connected by two other skyways to Shun Tak Centre.
 Nam Wan
A former knoll in the Shek Pik Reservoir
A former knoll in the Shing Mun (Jubilee) Reservoir
 - a former knoll isolated from the mainland after construction of High Island Reservoir
Former knolls and hills in the Tai Lam Chung Reservoir
The central tower of Ting Kau Bridge stands on an artificial island in the Rambler Channel.
The west tower of Tsing Ma Bridge stands on an artificial island in the Ma Wan Channel
Duplicate Tsing Yi South Bridge - two artificial islets to the south of two bridge columns, to prevent ships from colliding with the bridge.
Southern half of Lamma Power Station
Hong Kong–Macau–Zhuhai Bridge Hong Kong Control Point
Breakwaters of many typhoon shelters
 An island at the confluence of River Sutlej and River Beas into River Indus, where Sheung Shui Abattoir and Shek Wu Hui Sewage Treatment Works are located.
 Shatin Floating Restaurant (aka Treasure Floating Restaurant, Star Seafood Floating Restaurant)
 Tsing Tsuen Bridge - two artificial islands to the north of the two bridge columns
Former
 West Kowloon Reclamation during its construction stage

India
Willingdon Island
Murud-Janjira
Jag Mandir
Nehru Garden
Taj Lake Palace
Padmadurg
Kesar Kyari
Jal Mahal

Japan

Chubu Centrair International Airport (
 
Dejima in Nagasaki (Historic) (1634)
Dream Island (Yume No Shima) (1939)
Islands for Tokyo Disneyland in Urayasu
Islands for Haneda International Airport runway expansion.
 
Heiwa Island, in Tokyo Bay
 
Island City, Fukuoka (Hakata) harbour
Kansai International Airport (1994)
 
Kaze no Tō
Kisarazu Island for Tokyo Bay Aqua-Line
Kobe Airport
  
 , off Hakodate
New Kitakyushu Airport
Nagasaki Airport
Odaiba, Tokyo Bay
 
Painuhama-cho, Ishigaki-shi, Okinawa-ken
Port Island, Kobe harbour
Rokkō Island, Kobe harbour
 
The Second Sea Fortress, Tokyo Bay (The first and second fortresses were sunk)
Umihotaru
 Wakaejima (artificial)
 Wakasu

Kuwait
 Boubyan Sea Port
 Khiran Sea City
 Green Island  (Kuwait)

Macau
 Aterro da "Zona A" dos Novos Aterros Urbanos
 Aterro da "Zona C" dos Novos Aterros Urbanos
 
 Macau International Airport
 	
Islets in the Lagos Nam Van
  (southern half part of Macau)

Malaysia
 Malacca Island, Malacca City, Malacca. 
 Marina island Pangkor, Lumut, Perak.
 Forest City, Johor Bahru, Johor
 Gazumbo Island, Gelugor, Penang
 Seri Tanjung Pinang, Tanjung Tokong, Penang

Maldives
 Gaadhoo (Laamu atoll)
 Gulhi Falhu
 Hulhumalé (2004)
 Thilafushi (1992)
 Velana International Airport

Mexico
 Spiral Island, a small floating island

Montenegro
 The Lady Of the Rocks / Gospa od Skrpjela, a small island contribute to Our Lady of the Rocks, situated in the Bay of Kotor.

Netherlands
Flevoland
IJburg
IJsseloog
Neeltje-Jans
Pampus
REM Island
Maasvlakte
Marker Wadden

Oman
 Al Mouj Muscat
 Sohar Port
 Duqm Port

Peru/Bolivia
Uros, inhabited artificial floating islands made of reed on Lake Titicaca

Qatar
Lusail, new development north of Doha with several artificial islands.
The Pearl
Hamad International Airport
Ras Laffan 
Hamad Port
Banana Island Resort

Russia
Nineteen artificial islands in the Gulf of Finland for fortresses. 
 Cherepakha Islet
 Federation Island
 New Holland Island
 Sukho (island)
 Port of Bronka

 Sviyazhsk

Saudi Arabia
 King Abdullah Port
 Manifah Field
 King Abdul Aziz Sea Port
 Yanbu Island
 Jazan Economic City
 King Fahd Industrial Ports
 Areas around Alkhobar & Dhahran 
 King Salman International Complex for Maritime Industries 
 Coast line of Jeddah

Solomon Islands
Sulufou
Adagege
Funaafou
Foueda
Niuleni
Ferasubua
Saua
Auki Island

South Africa
Island in Kamfers Dam, constructed as a flamingo breeding island
Durban Port

South Korea
 Banpo Seorae Island (Seoraeseom)
 Sebitseom (Sebit islets)
 Songdo International Business District
 Yeouido

Sri Lanka
Colombo Port City (2014–)
Hambantota Port

Taiwan

Tonga
Former Republic of Minerva

Tunisia
 Coast of Sfax

United Arab Emirates

Abu Dhabi
Yas Island
Al Lulu Island
Khalifah Port

Dubai

Burj al-Arab, a hotel on a small artificial island.
The Palm Islands (The Palm, Jumeirah, The Palm, Jebel Ali, and The Palm, Deira). The Palm Jebel Ali has had most of its land filled, but both the Palm Jebel Ali and the Palm Deira projects are on hold as of 2013. 
The World Islands, currently uninhabited.
Bluewaters Island
Jumeirah Bay Island
Jumeirah Island 2
Pearl Jumeirah
Dubai Harbour
Dubai Waterfront
The Universe

Ras al Khaimah
Bal al Bahr
Mina al Arab
Al Hamra Village

Sharjah
Hamriyah
Flag Island
Al Khan
Al Mamzar
Al Majaz Island

Fujairah
 Fujairah Port

United Kingdom

England
Challis Island, Cambridgeshire
Crossrail Place, Canary Wharf, Greater London
Whale Island, Hampshire, in Portsmouth harbour

Scotland
 Several hundred crannógs in Scotland

United States

Alabama
Gaillard Island, is an artificially created island located in Mobile Bay near Mobile, Alabama. It was built by the United States Army Corps of Engineers, using sand and mud dredged from the Mobile Bay ship channel and elsewhere. The island is an important site for colonial nesting seabirds and shore birds in coastal Alabama and has been the only nesting site for brown pelicans (Pelecanus occidentalis) in Alabama - first discovered in 1983.

Alaska
Northstar Island, an island built for oil drilling and extraction from the Northstar Oil Pool in the Beaufort Sea.

California
Tom Sawyer Island, Frontierland, Disneyland theme park
Balboa Island (Newport Beach)
Treasure Island (San Francisco Bay)
Rincon Island (off Ventura County Coast)
THUMS Islands (also called Astronaut Islands) - four artificial island oil platforms (off Long Beach Harbor) 
Coast Guard Island (Oakland Estuary, San Francisco Bay area)
Long Beach Port

Florida 
Isola di Lolando (Miami) - Failed artificial island construction project.
Hibiscus Island (Miami Beach) (1922)
San Pablo Island (name not official) (Jacksonville Beaches) (1912)
Palm Island (Miami Beach)
Peanut Island (Riviera Beach) (1918)
Star Island (Miami Beach)
Venetian Islands (Miami Beach) - Includes Belle Isle, Biscayne Island, Di Lido Island and Flagler Monument Island.
Fisher Island (Miami)
Watson Island (Miami)
Dodge Island (Miami)
Sunset Islands (Miami Beach) - 4 separate, numbered islands
Brickell Key (Miami)

Illinois 
Goose Island (Chicago)
Northerly Island (Chicago)

Kentucky 
 Shippingport, a former town now within the boundaries of Louisville that became an island in 1825 when the Louisville and Portland Canal was built as a bypass of the Falls of the Ohio.

Michigan 
 Keweenaw Peninsula, Michigan

New Jersey/Delaware
Artificial Island, New Jersey (Alloway Township, New Jersey)/a tiny portion of Delaware

New York
U Thant Island (Manhattan)
Hoffman Island (Staten Island)
Swinburne Island (Staten Island)

Washington 
 Harbor Island (Seattle)
 Duck Island, in Green Lake Park, Seattle.

Wisconsin 
 Door County (north of the canal)

Land disconnected by artificial canals 
 Africa has been separated from Eurasia by the Suez Canal
 Barnegat Peninsula, New Jersey, United States (Point Pleasant Canal)
 Cape Cod, Massachusetts, United States (Cape Cod Canal)
 Cape Henlopen, Rehoboth Beach, Delaware, and environs (Lewes and Rehoboth Canal)
 Cape Island, New Jersey, United States (Cape May Canal)
Cijin/Kaohsiung Port, Kaohsiung, Taiwan
 Delmarva Peninsula, United States (Chesapeake & Delaware Canal; lockless)
 Western Europe (Rhône–Rhine Canal and rivers)
 Fenwick Island, Delaware and Maryland, United States (Assawoman Canal)
 Southern Florida (Okeechobee Waterway)
 Southeastern New Jersey (Delaware and Raritan Canal)
 Part of North Carolina (Alligator-Pungo Canal)
 Peloponnese, Greece (Corinth Canal; lockless)
 Southern Sweden (Göta Canal and Trollhätte Canal and rivers)
 Sviyazhsk, Russia
 Eastern United States and southeastern Canada (Chicago Sanitary and Ship Canal and Chicago River, Mississippi River, Great Lakes, St. Lawrence Seaway)
 Virginia Beach and Norfolk, Virginia, United States (Albemarle and Chesapeake Canal)
 Eastern Virginia and North Carolina, United States (Dismal Swamp Canal)
 Potonggang-guyok, North Korea, between Pothong River and Pothonggang Canal
 Sääminginsalo, Saimaa, Finland

Former hilltops in artificial lakes 

 Barro Colorado Island, a former hilltop in the Panama Canal Zone, Panama
 René-Levasseur Island, Québec, Canada

See also

 Lists of islands
 List of unusual drainage systems (where land is isolated by natural two-way drainage)

References

Artificial